Sorghum production in Chad is one of the country's most important subsistence crops. In Chad, sorghum (Sorghum guineense) is a staple food crop which is also used as animal feed and for brewing beer. It accounts for only 1.1% of world production and its world ranking is 17.

References

Sorghum production
Agriculture in Chad